Hyporhina is an extinct genus of amphisbaenians or worm lizards that lived from the Late Eocene to the Middle Oligocene (approximately 40 to 30 million years ago) in what is now the western United States.

Species
It currently includes two species, both from the White River Formation in eastern Wyoming and northeastern Colorado:
 Hyporhina antiqua — the type species.
 Hyporhina galbreathi 
 Hyporhina tertia — a third species named in 1972, and later synonymized with Hyporhina galbreathi.

Taxonomy
Paleontologist Georg Baur named the genus Hyporhina in 1893, making it one of the first prehistoric amphisbaenians to be described. Baur placed it in its own family, Hyporhinidae, because it possessed eye sockets that are enclosed at the back by postorbital bars, a feature that living amphisbaenians lack.

However, more recent studies have placed it within Rhineuridae, a family that includes the living Rhineura floridana from Florida, and many more extinct species from the western United States that were named after 1893 and have postorbital bars. Hyporhina differs from other rhineurids in having a steep angle to its snout.

See also

References

Amphisbaenians
Paleogene lizards
Eocene lepidosaurs
Oligocene lepidosaurs
White River Fauna
Eocene reptiles of North America
Paleogene reptiles of North America
Lizard genera
Prehistoric reptile genera
Eocene United States
Eocene genus first appearances
Oligocene genus extinctions
Fossil taxa described in 1893
Taxa named by Georg Baur